Stay: Yoake no Soul is the seventh studio album by Japanese group Garnet Crow. The album was released on September 30, 2009, by Giza Studio. The lead single, "Yume no Hitotsu", was released on August 13, 2008.

Commercial performance 
"Stay: Yoake no Soul" made its chart debut on the official Oricon Albums Chart at #7rank for first week with 22,802 sold copies. It charted for 6 weeks and sold 31,092 copies.

Track listing 
All tracks are composed by Yuri Nakamura, written by Nana Azuki and arranged by Hirohito Furui.

Usage in media
Hyaku Nen no Kodoku was used as theme song in anime movie Fist of the North Star: The Legends of the True Savior
Hana wa Saite Tada Yurete was used as ending for TBS program Uwasa no! Tokyo Magazine
Doing all right was used as outro song for anime Detective Conan
On My Way was used as ending song for Fuji TV program Hokkaido Marathon 2009
Yume Hitotsu was used as the ending song for anime Golgo 13

References 

2009 albums
Being Inc. albums
Japanese-language albums
Giza Studio albums
Garnet Crow albums
Albums produced by Daiko Nagato